Protoconchoididae is an extinct family of Paleozoic molluscs of uncertain taxonomic position, i.e. they were either (Gastropoda or Monoplacophora).

Taxonomy 
The taxonomy of the Gastropoda by Bouchet & Rocroi, 2005 categorizes Protoconchoididae within the 
Paleozoic molluscs of uncertain systematic position. This family is unassigned to superfamily. This family has no subfamilies.

Genera 
Genera in the family Protoconchoididae include:
 Protoconchoides Shaw, 1962 - type genus of the family Protoconchoididae

References 

Prehistoric gastropods